Coleophora ammodyta is a moth of the family Coleophoridae that can be found in Turkestan, Uzbekistan and Saudi Arabia.

The larvae feed on the fruit of Salsola richteri. The larvae do not make a case, but live inside the fruit. The larvae are yellowish-white with a brown head and a length of about 6 mm. They can be found from September to October. They hibernate in sandy cocoons after feeding.

References

External links

ammodyta
Moths of Asia
Moths described in 1973